Arsenicitalea  is a genus of bacteria from the family of Devosiaceae  with one known species (Arsenicitalea aurantiaca).

References

Hyphomicrobiales
Bacteria genera
Monotypic bacteria genera